KWCC-LD, virtual and UHF digital channel 47, branded on-air as NCW Life Channel, is a low-powered independent television station licensed to Wenatchee, Washington, United States. The station is owned by the SolelyOn Broadcasting subsidiary of LocalTel Communications. The station carries local programming, local sports, local events and multiplexes the major networks onto its digital signal and translator network serving Chelan, Douglas, Grant and parts of Adams, Franklin, Kittitas counties.

History

The station started operations on December 10, 1989 as K13EZ, an independent station that aired local programming and real state information. K13EZ began airing TBN programming overnight and weekends in 1993 after KCWT's transmitter failed. The arrangement ended in 2006. K13EZ became K47EW on June 14, 1995 when the station moved from channel 13 to channel 47. K47EW became KWCC-LP on March 10, 2003. The station changed its call letters to the current KWCC-LD calls on September 3, 2009 possibly to reflect that the station is broadcasting as a digital only station.

The station also aired select programming from BYU TV until 2015.

In November 2015, after the sale to LocalTel, KWCC 47.1 relaunched as the NCW Life channel, adding more live programming to schedule, such as regional high school sports, Wenatchee Wild hockey, and Wenatchee AppleSox baseball. The community billboard and "The River" (which played classic rock music in the background year round, and Christmas music in December), long associated with the channel, moved to 47.2 (an audio feed of "The River" was broadcasting on 87.7 FM, that has since ceased). "The Wenatchee Valley Visitors Guide" is on 47.3, featuring programming about the history of the Wenatchee Valley and North Central Washington. 47.3 also carried TVW.

On September 1, 2016, KWCC moved the Visitor's Guide to channel 47.2, ceasing all operations of the community billboard. Channel 47.3 now airs classic rock videos 24/7, branded as "The River".

In June 2018, both the Visitor's Guide and The River music channel were pulled from 47.2 and .3, respectively, and have since gone silent, thou a Windows wallpaper background screen is currently visible on 47.2. As of November 2018, both channels were back on the air.

On the week of March 16, 2020, "The River Music TV" was replaced by a 24-hour loop of the show "NCW Life Sights and Sounds", which offers scenic views from around North Central
Washington set to orchestrated music, which was temporary, as three weeks later, it would be replaced with a live 24/7 camera feed of the Wenatchee Valley from Mission Ridge. The channel was renamed "CommTV", for "Community Television", and along with camera feeds from around the region, air religious services from area churches, most of which was done during the COVID-19 pandemic.

Digital channels
The station's digital signal is multiplexed:

Cable Coverage and Internet Streaming

KWCC-LP's NCW Life Channel is carried on Charter Communications channel 19, in Standard Definition, and, along with CommTV, on Chelan and Douglas County Fiber Network channel 12 and 99, respectively, both in High Definition. NCW Life channel is also streaming live on the web. as well as KWCC-LP sister station website at www.realestateontv.com

Translators

References

External links
NCWLife official website

Television channels and stations established in 1989
1989 establishments in Washington (state)
Low-power television stations in the United States